Arnold Johannes Hyacinthus Mühren (born 2 June 1951) is a Dutch football manager and former midfielder. His older brother Gerrie, also a midfield player, won three European Cup titles with Ajax in the early 1970s. Mühren is among the few players to have won all three major UEFA-organised club competitions, the European Cup (1972–73), the Cup Winners' Cup (1986–87) and the UEFA Cup (1980–81). The last of these was won with Ipswich Town, while the other titles were won while playing for Ajax. He is also one of the two Dutch players, together with Danny Blind, to have won all UEFA club competitions.

Career
Born in Volendam, North Holland, Mühren started his career at FC Volendam. He moved to Ajax Amsterdam in 1971, winning three domestic and three international titles in his first two seasons there. His third season with Ajax yielded no titles, but he found further success after a transfer to FC Twente, winning the KNVB Cup in 1977 and reaching the 1975 UEFA Cup Final. A year later he moved to Ipswich Town in England for a fee of £150,000; in the same year he made his international debut in a 4–0 win against Tunisia. 

Mühren was part of the successful Ipswich team that won the 1981 UEFA Cup, and finished second in the league that year and the season after. In 1982, he transferred to Manchester United. He helped United win the 1983 FA Cup Final by scoring a penalty in the replay against Brighton, and left the club after the 1985 FA Cup Final, in which United defeated Everton. He did not feature in the match squad for the 1985 final, having lost his place in the team that season to new signing Jesper Olsen. Mühren was one of the few players from outside the United Kingdom and Ireland playing in English football during the late 1970s and early 1980s.

After seven years in England, Mühren returned to Ajax, where he added the European Cup Winners' Cup (1986–87) to his trophy collection. Mühren also reached the final the following year in 1988 but lost to KV Mechelen. At the age of 37, he achieved the highlight of his career, when he was a vital part of the Netherlands national team that won the European Championships in 1988. In the final against the Soviet Union he provided the cross from which Marco van Basten scored the second goal (considered one of the greatest volleyed goals of all time). Mühren continued playing for Ajax for one more season after that, before retiring in 1989 at the age of 38.

Honours

Ajax
Eredivisie: 1971–72, 1972–73
KNVB Cup: 1971–72, 1985–86, 1986–87
European Cup: 1972–73
European Cup Winners' Cup: 1986–87
European Super Cup: 1973
Intercontinental Cup: 1972

Twente
KNVB Cup: 1976–77

Ipswich Town
UEFA Cup: 1980–81

Manchester United
FA Cup: 1982–83
FA Charity Shield: 1983

Netherlands
UEFA European Championship: 1988

Individual
Ipswich Town Player of the Year: 1978–79
Ipswich Town Hall of Fame: Inducted 2009

See also
 List of players to have won all international club competitions
 List of players to have won the three main European club competitions

References

External links

1951 births
Living people
People from Volendam
Dutch footballers
Dutch expatriate footballers
Netherlands international footballers
Association football midfielders
Eredivisie players
English Football League players
FC Volendam players
AFC Ajax players
FC Twente players
Ipswich Town F.C. players
Manchester United F.C. players
Expatriate footballers in England
Dutch expatriate sportspeople in England
UEFA Euro 1988 players
UEFA European Championship-winning players
AFC Ajax non-playing staff
UEFA Cup winning players
FA Cup Final players
Footballers from North Holland